Athletics competitions at the 2011 Pan American Games in Guadalajara was held from October 23 to October 30 at the newly built Telmex Athletics Stadium. The racewalking and marathon events were held on the temporary Guadalajara Circuit and Route and the Pan American Marathon circuit respectively. The sport of athletics is split into distinct sets of events: track and field events, road running events, and racewalking events.

Mirroring the Olympic athletics programme, both men and women had very similar schedules of events. Men competed in 24 events and women in 23, as their schedule lacks the 50 km race walk. In addition, both the men's 110 m hurdles and decathlon are reflected in the women's schedule by the 100 m hurdles and heptathlon, respectively.

As they had done in the 2007 edition, Cuba topped the athletics medal table, taking 18 gold medals and 33 medals in total. The Brazilian team were a clear second with ten golds and 23 medals overall. The hosts Mexico and the United States both won four events each, while Colombia had the third greatest medal haul with seventeen altogether.

Over the seven-day competition, fourteen Pan American Games records were equalled or bettered. Furthermore, two South American records were set: Brazil's Lucimara da Silva broke the heptathlon record and the Brazilian women's 4×100 metres relay quartet also improved a continental mark.

Medal summary

Men's events

 † : The original long jump winner was Víctor Castillo of Venezuela, but a positive drug test for methylhexaneamine meant he was stripped of his title and given a lifetime ban.

Women's events

Medal table

Participation
A total of 668 athletes from 39 countries were entered in the athletics competition. A maximum of two participants were allowed per country for each individual event. Nations were able to enter one competitor who had not achieved the minimum standard performance. To register a second competitor, both athletes needed to have achieved the minimum standard performance.

References

Day reports
Robinson, Javier Clavelo (2011-10-24). Guatemala sweeps 20Km Race Walks, da Silva takes Marathon gold - Pan American Games, Day 1. IAAF. Retrieved on 2011-10-31.
Robinson, Javier Clavelo (2011-10-25). Silva upsets Murer to capture gold, Collins clocks 10.00 Games’ record in semis – Pan American Games, Day 2. IAAF. Retrieved on 2011-10-31.
Robinson, Javier Clavelo (2011-10-26). Suarez and Armstrong set new records, Clarke outsprints Collins - Pan American Games, Day 3. IAAF. Retrieved on 2011-10-31.
Robinson, Javier Clavelo (2011-10-27). Brenes improves to 44.65, Maggi sails 6.94m in Guadalajara - Pan American Games, Day 4. IAAF. Retrieved on 2011-10-31.
Robinson, Javier Clavelo (2011-10-28). Cisneros joins sub-48 club with 47.99, Thompson soars to 2.32m - Pan American Games, Day 5. IAAF. Retrieved on 2011-10-31.
Robinson, Javier Clavelo (2011-10-29). Robles 13.10, Borges 5.80m and Ibarguen 14.92m in Guadalajara - Pan American Games, Day 6. IAAF. Retrieved on 2011-10-31.
Robinson, Javier Clavelo (2011-10-31). Nava and da Silva take last athletics titles in Guadalajara as Pan American Games conclude. IAAF. Retrieved on 2011-10-31.
Results
PAG  Guadalajara  MEX  23 - 30 October  - 16th Pan American Games, Telmex Stadium. Tilastopaja. Retrieved on 2011-11-02.
All Athletics Pdfs until 30 of oct at 19:16. Guadalajara2011. Retrieved on 2012-07-18.

External links
 Official website
 Official athletics results page

 
Athletics
Pan American
2011
2011 Pan American Games